Sir Guilford Lindsey Molesworth  (1828–1925) was an English civil engineer.

Biography

Early years
Molesworth was born in Millbrook, Hampshire and was the son of John Edward Nassau Molesworth, Vicar of Rochdale who was a great grandson  of Robert Molesworth, 1st Viscount Molesworth. Sir Guildford's great niece was  Margaret Patricia Molesworth (1904–1985), the grandmother of Sophie, Duchess of Edinburgh.
Molesworth  was educated at the College for Civil Engineers at Putney, apprenticed under Mr Dockray in the London and North Western Railway, and under Sir William Fairbairn at Manchester.

Career
He became a chief assistant engineer of the London, Brighton and South Coast Railway, but soon resigned to conduct the constructions at the Royal Arsenal, Woolwich, during the Crimean War. He received the Watt Medal and the Manby premium in 1858 from the Institution of Civil Engineers for his paper on Conversion of Wood by Machinery. He returned to London for a number of years, worked at his profession, then went to Ceylon in 1859 and in 1862 became chief engineer of the government railways in Ceylon. From 1871 to 1889 he was consulting engineer to the Indian government with regard to State railways. In May 1888, he was made a Knight Commander of the Order of the Indian Empire (KCIE).
He received medals from the British Government for his services during the Afghan War and the Burma War, and was president of the Institution of Civil Engineers in 1904.

Gauge 

Molesworth was consulted on a number of occasions on the suitability of adopting a narrow gauge rather than a broad one. He was generally against the narrow gauge as he regarded the cost savings as illusory.  His broad gauge line to Kandy was meant to prove that the gauge was practicable in steep mountains.

Bibliography 

He published the Molesworth's Pocket Book of Engineering Formulae. This useful little volume contained formulas and details on many engineering related subjects. The first edition was published in November 1862 and ran to over thirty editions (The twenty-eighth edition was published in 1921).

His other works include:
 State Railways in India (1872)
 Metrical Tables (1880; fourth edition, 1909)
 Imperialism in India (1885)
 Silver and Gold (1891)
 Our Empire under Protection and Free Trade (1902)
 Economic and Fiscal Facts and Fallacies (1909)
 Indian Railway Policy (1920)

References

External links 
 
        
        
        
        
        
        

1828 births
1925 deaths
British railway civil engineers
English non-fiction writers
British people of the Second Anglo-Afghan War
British people of the Crimean War
Presidents of the Institution of Civil Engineers
Engineers from Southampton
Knights Commander of the Order of the Indian Empire
Railway officers in British India
English male non-fiction writers